This is a list of place-names in countries outside of Wales which are named after places in Wales, or derived from the Welsh language, or are known to be named after a Welsh person.

Argentina

Chubut
 Bagillt Lake - named after Bagillt, Wales
 Bryn Crwn - Welsh for 'round hill'.
 Bryn Gwyn - Welsh for 'white hill'.
 Dolavon - from Dolafon, the Welsh for 'meadow by the river'.
 Drofa Dulog
 Glan Alaw - Welsh for Owen Jones, the donor of the land.
 Glyn Du - Welsh for 'black creek' or 'black valley'.
 Hendre - Welsh for 'Old Town'.
 Puerto Madryn - named after the Welsh estate of Sir Love Jones-Parry.
 Trelew - named after Welsh settler Lewis Jones.
 Treorky - also Treorcky.
 Trevelin - from Trefelin, the Welsh for 'Mill Town'.
 Tyr Gobaith - Welsh for 'land oh hope'.
 Tyr Halen - Welsh for 'salty earth'.

Australia
New South Wales - Captain James Cook originally called it 'New Wales', later adding the 'South'.
Aberdare
Aberglasslyn - likely corruption of Aberglaslyn
Abermain
 Allynbrook - from River Alyn
Bangor - named after the birthplace of the landowner.
Cardiff - name suggested by a Welsh settler in 1889.
East Gresford-probably named after Gresford in North Wales
 Llanarth - suburb of Bathurst, from Llanarth
Llandilo
Llangothlin - anglicisation of Llangollen
Swansea - a coal mining community.
Queensland
Carnarvon Gorge
Ebbw Vale
Merthyr
 Tasmania
Abergavenny
Beaumaris named after Beaumaris
Swansea - settled by people from Pembrokeshire, Wales
 Victoria
Anglesea - corruption of Anglesey
 Llanelly - either from Llanelly or Llanelli
Welshpool
 Western Australia
Carnarvon - named after Henry Herbert, 4th Earl of Carnarvon; anglicisation of Caernarfon
Welshpool
 Perth [Brythonic/Pictish/Old Welsh from the Scottish City of Perth]

Canada
Alberta
Berwyn
Caernarvon
Cardiff - a hamlet near Alberta's first coal mine.
Ontario
Bala - It is considered one of the hubs of cottage country located north of Toronto. 
Cardiff - a small mining community.
Pontypool - unincorporated village, used as the setting for a movie of the same name

England
Herefordshire:  Numerous villages, parishes and farms in the Archenfield region adjacent to Wales, including:
Bagwyllydiart
Ewyas Harold
Llangarron
Llanveynoe
Maes-coed
Pontrilas
Shropshire:  Numerous villages, parishes and farms, notably in the Oswestry area adjacent to Wales, including:

Bettws-y-Crwyn
Brogyntyn
Bryn-y-Cochin
Coed-y-Go
Craigllwyn
Croesau Bach
Hengoed
Llanforda
Llanyblodwel
Llawnt
Llynclys
Nant-y-Gollen
Pant
Pant Glas
Pentre Pant
Rhyn
Selattyn
Trefonen
Wern Ddu
Worcestershire: 
Pensax

Jamaica
Welsh settlers arrived on the island, most notably the infamous Welsh governor, Henry Morgan, and influenced placenames. 
 Bangor Ridge (Portland)
 Llandilo (Westmoreland)
 Llandovery (St Ann)
 Llandewey (St Thomas)

Nepal
 Western Cwm - a glacial valley on the face of Mount Everest (cwm is Welsh for 'valley')

New Zealand
North Island
Brynderwyn Range
Cardiff
South Island
Bryndwr (Christchurch)
Milford Sound

South Africa
Llandudno, Cape Town

United States

Alabama
Bangor
Cardiff
Powell
Arizona
Swansea - a former copper mining town.
California
Bryn Mawr
Cardiff-by-the-Sea
Swansea - a former mining town.
Illinois
Bryn Mawr
Cardiff - formerly a coal mining town
Swansea
Kansas
Powell Observatory in Wea Township, Miami County
Kentucky
Owensboro - named for Abraham Owen.
Maine
Bangor
Pembroke
Maryland
Berwyn Heights
Cardiff - formerly a slate mining town
Massachusetts
Pembroke
Swansea
Michigan
Howell
Howell Township, Livingston
Minnesota
Bryn Mawr
Missouri
Howell
Howell County
Powell, Cass County
Powell Gardens in Kingsville
Powell Hall, St. Louis
Powell, McDonald County
Nebraska
Powell
New Jersey
Howell Township, Monmouth County
Monmouth County
New York
Bangor
Pembroke
Ohio
Powell
Pennsylvania See Welsh tract for more information
Bala Cynwyd
Bangor -  the first Chief Burgess an emigrant from Wales.
Berwyn
Bryn Athyn
Bryn Mawr - founded by Welsh Quakers.
Caernarvon Township
Upper Gwynedd and Lower Gwynedd Townships.
Haverford
Montgomery County
Narberth
Nanty Glo - from the Welsh nant y glo, stream of coal.
North Wales
Radnor Township
Tredyffrin Township
South Carolina
Swansea
South Dakota
Powell, Edmunds County
Powell, Haakon County
Tennessee
Cardiff - an iron and coal mining town
Powell
Texas
Powell
Utah
Howell
Lake Powell on the border between San Juan & Kane counties
Wisconsin
Powell
Wyoming
Powell

See also
 Welsh exonyms
 Welsh placenames
 Welsh settlement in the Americas
 Welsh settlement in Argentina
 Welsh Tract, Pennsylvania

References

External links
Welsh Place Names in the USA (Americymru.net)
The People Who Came (Jamaica-gleanor.com)

 
Wales-related lists